Sweat  is the fluid excreted by the sweat glands during perspiration.

Sweat or sweating may also refer to:

Places
 SWEAT (hypothesis), which proposes that the Southwestern United States was at one time connected to East Antarctica
 Sweat Mountain, in the U.S. state of Georgia

People
 Brooke Sweat (born 1986), American beach volleyball player
 David Sweat, convicted murderer who escaped from the Clinton Correctional Facility in Dannemora, New York on June 6, 2015
 Josh Sweat (born 1997), American football player
 Keith Sweat (born 1961), R&B/soul singer, songwriter and record producer
 Lorenzo De Medici Sweat (1818–1898), former U.S. Representative from Maine
 Montez Sweat (born 1996), American football player
 Noah S. Sweat (1922–1996), judge, law professor and state representative in Mississippi

Arts, entertainment, and media

Films
 Sweat (2002 film), Sueurs, a French action film
 Sweat (2008 film), a short LGBT-related film, see List of LGBT-related films of 2008
 Sweat (2020 film), a Swedish-Polish drama film

Literature
 Sweat (play), a 2015 play by Lynn Nottage 
 "Sweat" (short story), by American writer Zora Neale Hurston
 Sweat (novel), a 1934 novel by Jorge Amado
 The sweats, an alternate name for the men's adventure genre of magazines

Music

Albums
 Sweat (Hadise album), 2005
 Sweat (Kool & the Gang album), 1989
 Sweat (Nelly album), 2004
 Sweat (The System album), 1983

Songs
 "Sweat" (Ciara song), 2013
 "Sweat" (Hadise song), 1983
 "Sweat" (Snoop Dogg song)
 "Sweat" (The All-American Rejects song), 2017
 "Sweat", a song by Tool from Opiate 
 "Sweat", a song by Oingo Boingo from Good for Your Soul
 "Sweat", a song by the Jon Spencer Blues Explosion from Orange
 "Sweat", a 1981 single by Brick
 "Sweat (A La La La La Long)", a song by Inner Circle from their 1993 album Bad to the Bone

Television
 Sweat (Australian TV series), Australian drama series
 Sweat (Canadian TV series), Canadian TV series

Heat
 Sweat lodge, a hut, typically dome-shaped and made with natural materials, used by Indigenous peoples of the Americas for ceremonial steam baths and prayer
 Sweating (cooking), heating vegetables in a little oil or butter, without any watery liquid
 Sweating, a labour practice relating to sweatshops
 Soldering, a term in metalwork sometimes referred to as sweating

Other uses
 Sweat, slang verb meaning to agonize over, to pressure, or to stalk someone
 Sweating sickness, a mysterious disease which struck between 1485 and 1551
Sweating, a method of coin debasement where coins are shaken in a bag and shed material is collected

See also
 Sweet (disambiguation)
 Swett (disambiguation)